Kemoy Campbell (born January 14, 1991) is a retired Jamaican distance runner who competed in various events from 800 meters to 5000 metres. Since competing in the American collegiate circuit, he has developed a reputation for having remarkable range, having competitive experience from the 800 meters to the 10K. Campbell holds multiple Jamaican records in athletics.

Running career

Youth
As a youngster, Campbell ran on the track team of Bellefield High School, in Manchester Parish, Jamaica. Although the overwhelming majority on the team were sprinters, Campbell was coached for distance running; one of his first races was a 5K road race. While still in Bellefield HS, Campbell was scouted by the University of Arkansas, the school he would attend many years later.  In 2010, he became the first Jamaican high schooler to win the high school boys 3000m at the Penn Relays.

Collegiate
Campbell first ran with South Plains College of Levelland, Texas, with whom he won NJCAA titles in the 800 meters and in cross country. He subsequently transferred to the same university which had scouted him back in Jamaica, University of Arkansas. At Arkansas, Campbell was coached by Chris Bucknam. At the 2013 NCAA DI Outdoor T&F Championships, Campbell placed fifth in the men's 5000 meters final and placed second in the men's 3000 meters at the 2013 NCAA Division 1 Indoor Track and Field Championships.

Professional
Campbell opened the indoor season with an altitude 4:02.59 mile in Flagstaff, Arizona representing New Balance on January 22, 2016.
Campbell set a PR and Jamaican indoor record in the men's 3000 meters representing New Balance at the 2016 Millrose Games on February 20.

Kemoy Campbell placed fifth in 13:30.09 in the 5000 metres on May 20, 2016 at the Hoka One One Mid Distance Classic hosted by Occidental College.

On February 26, 2017, Campbell ran 13:14.45 indoors at the BU Last Chance meet to break the Jamaican 5000m record.

Kemoy added a fourth national championship title to his collection on June 23, 2017, when he won the 5000m.

On August 12, 2017, Kemoy became the first male Jamaican distance runner to compete in a final at the IAAF World Championships in London. He finished 10th with a time of 13:39.74.

During the Millrose Games in 2019, Campbell lost consciousness due to sudden cardiac arrest, and CPR was performed by bystanders. A defibrillator had to be used to revive him. Campbell was setting the pace in the men's 3000m event.

On September 5, 2019, Campbell announced his retirement from competitive running.

He is currently coaching track and has been forced to limit his physical activity on the orders of his cardiologist.

References

External links

Living people
1991 births
Jamaican male middle-distance runners
Jamaican male long-distance runners
People from Mandeville, Jamaica
Arkansas Razorbacks men's track and field athletes
World Athletics Championships athletes for Jamaica
Athletes (track and field) at the 2016 Summer Olympics
Olympic athletes of Jamaica
Arkansas Razorbacks men's cross country runners
Jamaican male cross country runners
Jamaican Athletics Championships winners